La Maleva  is a 1923 silent Argentine film directed and written by José A. Ferreyra.

Cast
 Álvaro Escobar
 Gloria Grat
Elena Guido
Yolanda Labardén
Jorge Lafuente
José Plá
César Robles

External links
 

1923 films
1920s Spanish-language films
Argentine black-and-white films
Argentine silent films
Films directed by José A. Ferreyra